Meet Mukhi is an Indian film and television child actor who acts in television shows and advertisement commercials. He also appeared in the feature films My Friend Pinto, Rowdy Rathore and Torbaaz.

Career
Mukhi started his career as a television actor with the role of Sonu Prakash Shrivastav in Colors TV series Kairi — Rishta Khatta Meetha. He played the role of inspector's son in the movie Rowdy Rathore. Later in the year, he had a role in the Sapne Suhane Ladakpan Ke serial.

Mukhi played one of the main roles in Bal Gopal Kare Dhamaal, with Satyajit Sharma playing the other. He joined the Baal Krishna team to play the lead role of young Krishna.

Mukhi appeared in an episode of the Savdhaan India, which aired on 14 February 2018.

From October 2020–January 2021, he played the role of the youngest Gupta Brother, Rajat Narayan Gupta, in Star Bharat's Gupta Brothers.

In 2018, he played Subodh in Vighnaharta Ganesh, and in 2021 he returned to play Young Tulsidas in the same show.

Filmography

Films

Television

References

External links
 

21st-century Indian male child actors
2000s births
Living people
Male actors from Mumbai
Indian television male child actors
Male actors in Hindi television